Bujgan District is a district (bakhsh) in Torbat-e Jam County, Razavi Khorasan Province, Iran. At the 2006 census, its population was 18,400, in 3,916 families.  The District has two cities: Nilshahr & Ahmadabad-e Sowlat.  The District has two rural districts (dehestan): Dasht-e Jam Rural District and Harirud Rural District.

Astronomer Abu al-Wafa' Buzjani was born in the district.

References 

Districts of Razavi Khorasan Province
Torbat-e Jam County